Bringer of War is an EP by Rebaelliun that was released in 2000 by Hammerheart Records.

Track listing
 "Agonizing by My Hands" 
 "Bringer of War" 
 "Kings of Unholy Blood"
 "Day of Suffering" (Morbid Angel Cover)

Credits
Sandro Moreira: Drums
Marcello Marzari: Bass/Vocals
Fabiano Penna: Guitars

References

Rebaelliun albums